Hessische Landesbahn (Hessian State Railway, HLB) is a regional transport company owned by the German state of Hesse, based in Frankfurt am Main. It provides bus and rail passenger transport services and, to a lesser extent, rail freight services in Hesse and across the state’s borders through its subsidiaries and affiliates.

Company
The management of Hessische Landesbahn is supervised by Veit Salzmann. The districts and the State of Hesse are represented by four people on the Supervisory Board and the employees also have four seats on the Board.

Structure
Hessische Landesbahn GmbH operates as the holding company of three subsidiaries:
HLB Hessenbahn GmbH operates rail services;
HLB Hessenbus GmbH operates bus services;
HLB Basis AG provides the resources for the transport operators; it is a railway infrastructure company, it owns most of the vehicles operated and it operates vehicle workshops.

HLB Hessenbus and HLB Hessenbahn are 100 per cent owned subsidiary, HLB Basis is almost 85% owned by HLB, while the remaining shares are mostly owned by local authorities.

History

The company was founded in 1955 as a holding company of several non-government-owned railways in Hesse, which operated as an integrated railway company with its own rail infrastructure, stations, etc., as well as operations on this infrastructure.

In the course of the separation of infrastructure and operations in 2005, three of the four subsidiaries of HLB: the Frankfurt-Königsteiner Eisenbahn, the Butzbach-Licher Eisenbahn and the Kassel-Naumburger Eisenbahn were united under the holding company of the Frankfurt-Königsteiner Eisenbahn, since trading as HLB Basis, as the common infrastructure operator.

Train services

The subsidiaries of the Hessische Landesbahn operate 3.8 million train kilometres each year over 237.5 kilometres of line and 10.34 million vehicle kilometres each year over 1,013 km of bus route.

The main line of the HLB originally was the Königstein Railway between Königstein and Frankfurt-Höchst of the former Frankfurt-Königsteiner Eisenbahn (Frankfurt-Königstein Railway, FKE), known as the K-Bahn and part of the Frankfurter Verkehrsverbund (Frankfurt Transport Association, FVV).

In the 1990s, the HLB subsidiaries operated a number of local lines acquired from Deutsche Bahn in north and middle Hesse. Since 11 December 2005, HLB multiple units have operated on the Kahlgrund Railway from Hanau to Schöllkrippen in the Bavarian Spessart. Besides railways it operates buses and tram lines.

Since December 2010, HLB has also run on the main line Frankfurt–Gießen–Siegen/Marburg routes (RMV lines 98/99, the Main-Sieg-Express) and, since December 2011, it has operated Regionalbahn services on the RMV lines 45 and 52 on the Limburg–Gießen–Alsfeld–Fulda and the Fulda–Gersfeld routes.

Investments

HLB Basis AG has a 50% interest in Regionalbahn Kassel (RBK), with the remainder held by Kasseler Verkehrs-Gesellschaft (KVG). The KVG operates the Kassel–Waldkappel railway, which combines rail freight and tram traffic. The RBK, in turn, holds 49% of Regionaltram Betriebsgesellschaft, a joint venture with Deutsche Bahn, which, as RegioTram Kassel, operates tram-trains in the Kassel area.

Through other subsidiaries the HLB operates passenger transport services beyond the Hessian borders in four of the six neighbouring states:
in Rhineland-Palatinate, together with Westerwaldbahn GmbH, in vectus Verkehrsgesellschaft mbH (HLB 74.9%),
in North Rhine-Westphalia and Rhineland-Palatinate, together with Westerwaldbahn GmbH and Kreisbahn Siegen-Wittgenstein, in HellertalBahn GmbH (HLB 33%),
in Lower Saxony and Thuringia, together with BeNEX, a subsidiary of the Hamburger Hochbahn, in Cantus Verkehrsgesellschaft (HLB 50%),
in Thuringia, together with Erfurter Bahn (EB), in the Süd-Thüringen-Bahn GmbH (HLB 50%).

Fares
Hessische Landesbahn is a member of the Tarifverband der Bundeseigenen und Nichtbundeseigenen Eisenbahnen in Deutschland (Fare association of federally and non-federally owned railways in Germany). Tickets for travel on Deutsche Bahn trains can therefore also be used on HLB trains.

Lines
The following lines, using the numbering of the Rhein-Main-Verkehrsverbund are operated by the Hessische Landesbahn:

Notes

External links 

  

Private railway companies of Germany
Companies based in Hesse
Transport in Hesse